The 2018 GP Industria & Artigianato di Larciano was the 50th edition of the GP Industria & Artigianato di Larciano road cycling one day race. It was part of UCI Europe Tour in category 1.HC.

Teams
Twenty-four teams were invited to take part in the race. These included seven UCI World Tour teams, ten UCI Professional Continental teams, six UCI Continental teams and one national team.

Result

References

2018 UCI Europe Tour
2018 in Italian sport
GP Industria & Artigianato di Larciano